Mackaysee Lake is a lake located in Door County, Wisconsin. The lake is found on Chambers Island in Green Bay of Lake Michigan. There are two islands in Mackaysee Lake. Both are owned by the Door County Land Trust and are protected in the Chambers Island Nature Preserve. The islands are classified as third order recursive islands due to being in a lake on an island in a lake.

Three areas of shoreline along the north, west, and south of Mackaysee Lake are owned by the Door County Land Trust and are also enrolled in the Wisconsin Managed Forest program allowing public access.

Climate

See also
 List of lakes of Wisconsin § Door County

References

Lakes of Door County, Wisconsin